Griselda's lemniscomys or Griselda's striped grass mouse (Lemniscomys griselda) is a species of rodent in the family Muridae.

It is found in Angola, Democratic Republic of the Congo, and Zambia.

Its natural habitat is dry savanna.

References

 

Lemniscomys
Rodents of Africa
Mammals of Angola
Mammals of the Democratic Republic of the Congo
Mammals of Zambia
Mammals described in 1904
Taxa named by Oldfield Thomas
Taxonomy articles created by Polbot